The 1994 Fangoria Chainsaw Awards ceremony, presented by Fangoria magazine and Creation Entertainment, honored the best horror films of 1993 and took place on June 11, 1994, at the Hilton LAX in Los Angeles, California. The ceremony was hosted by Linnea Quigley.

Ceremony
The event was held as part of Fangoria'''s annual Weekend of Horrors convention, in partnership with Creation Entertainment. Hosted by B-movie scream queen Linnea Quigley, the 1994 event was notable for featuring an appearance by Jack Nicholson, promoting his upcoming film Wolf. Also present at the convention were Clive Barker, Howard Berger, Wes Craven, Frank Darabont, Tony Gardner, Peter Jackson, Sam Raimi, Scott Spiegel, Kevin Yagher.

Presenters
Richard Band — presenter for Best Soundtrack
Clint Howard and Cynthia Garris — presenter for Best Supporting Actor and Best Supporting Actress
Brent V. Friedman — presenter for Best Screenplay
Mike Deak — presenter for Best Makeup EFX 
Johnny Legend — presenter for Worst Film
Beverly Garland — presenter for Best Actress
Ted Raimi — presenter for Best Actor
C. Courtney Joyner — presenter for Best Limited Release/Direct-to-Video Film
Anthony Hickox — presenter for Best Wide-Release Film
Reggie Bannister — presenter for Fangoria'' Hall of Fame Award

Winners and nominees

Awards

Fangoria Hall of Fame Award
Peter Jackson
Angus Scrimm

External links
1994 Fangoria Chainsaw Award Winners 
1994 Fangoria Chainsaw Awards

Fangoria Chainsaw Awards
Fangoria Chainsaw Awards
Fangoria Chainsaw Awards
1994 in Los Angeles
1994 in American cinema